A molecular cloud, sometimes called a stellar nursery (if star formation is occurring within), is a type of interstellar cloud, the density and size of which permit absorption nebulae, the formation of molecules (most commonly molecular hydrogen, H2), and the formation of H II regions. This is in contrast to other areas of the interstellar medium that contain predominantly ionized gas.

Molecular hydrogen is difficult to detect by infrared and radio observations, so the molecule most often used to determine the presence of H2 is carbon monoxide (CO). The ratio between CO luminosity and H2 mass is thought to be constant, although there are reasons to doubt this assumption in observations of some other galaxies.

Within molecular clouds are regions with higher density, where much dust and many gas cores reside, called clumps. These clumps are the beginning of star formation if gravitational forces are sufficient to cause the dust and gas to collapse.

History
The form of molecular clouds by interstellar dust and hydrogen gas traces its links to the formation of the Solar System, approximately 4.6 billion years ago.

Occurrence

Within the Milky Way, molecular gas clouds account for less than one percent of the volume of the interstellar medium (ISM), yet it is also the densest part of the medium, comprising roughly half of the total gas mass interior to the Sun's galactic orbit. Large scale CO maps of the galaxy show that the position of this gas correlates with the spiral arms of the galaxy. That molecular gas occurs predominantly in the spiral arms suggests that molecular clouds must form and dissociate on a timescale shorter than 10 million years—the time it takes for material to pass through the arm region.

Vertically to the plane of the galaxy, the molecular gas inhabits the narrow midplane of the galactic disc with a characteristic scale height, Z, of approximately 50 to 75 parsecs, much thinner than the warm atomic (Z from 130 to 400 parsecs) and warm ionized (Z around 1000 parsecs) gaseous components of the ISM. The exception to the ionized-gas distribution are H II regions, which are bubbles of hot ionized gas created in molecular clouds by the intense radiation given off by young massive stars and as such they have approximately the same vertical distribution as the molecular gas.

This distribution of molecular gas is averaged out over large distances; however, the small scale distribution of the gas is highly irregular with most of it concentrated in discrete clouds and cloud complexes.

Types of molecular cloud

Giant molecular clouds

A vast assemblage of molecular gas that has more than 10 thousand times the mass of the Sun is called a giant molecular cloud (GMC). GMCs are around 15 to 600 light-years (5 to 200 parsecs) in diameter, with typical masses of 10 thousand to 10 million solar masses. Whereas the average density in the solar vicinity is one particle per cubic centimetre, the average density of a GMC is a hundred to a thousand times as great. Although the Sun is much denser than a GMC, the volume of a GMC is so great that it contains much more mass than the Sun. The substructure of a GMC is a complex pattern of filaments, sheets, bubbles, and irregular clumps.

Filaments are truly ubiquitous in the molecular cloud. Dense molecular filaments will fragment into gravitationally bound cores, most of which will evolve into stars. Continuous accretion of gas, geometrical bending, and magnetic fields may control the detailed fragmentation manner of the filaments. In supercritical filaments observations have revealed quasi-periodic chains of dense cores with spacing of 0.15 parsec comparable to the filament inner width.

The densest parts of the filaments and clumps are called "molecular cores", while the densest molecular cores are called "dense molecular cores" and have densities in excess of 104 to 106 particles per cubic centimetre. Observationally, typical molecular cores are traced with CO and dense molecular cores are traced with ammonia. The concentration of dust within molecular cores is normally sufficient to block light from background stars so that they appear in silhouette as dark nebulae.

GMCs are so large that "local" ones can cover a significant fraction of a constellation; thus they are often referred to by the name of that constellation, e.g. the Orion molecular cloud (OMC) or the Taurus molecular cloud (TMC). These local GMCs are arrayed in a ring in the neighborhood of the Sun coinciding with the Gould Belt. The most massive collection of molecular clouds in the galaxy forms an asymmetrical ring about the galactic center at a radius of 120 parsecs; the largest component of this ring is the Sagittarius B2 complex. The Sagittarius region is chemically rich and is often used as an exemplar by astronomers searching for new molecules in interstellar space.

Small molecular clouds

Isolated gravitationally-bound small molecular clouds with masses less than a few hundred times that of the Sun are called Bok globules. The densest parts of small molecular clouds are equivalent to the molecular cores found in GMCs and are often included in the same studies.

High-latitude diffuse molecular clouds

In 1984 IRAS identified a new type of diffuse molecular cloud. These were diffuse filamentary clouds that are visible at high galactic latitudes. These clouds have a typical density of 30 particles per cubic centimetre.

Processes

Star formation

The formation of stars occurs exclusively within molecular clouds. This is a natural consequence of their low temperatures and high densities, because the gravitational force acting to collapse the cloud must exceed the internal pressures that are acting "outward" to prevent a collapse. There is observed evidence that the large, star-forming clouds are confined to a large degree by their own gravity (like stars, planets, and galaxies) rather than by external pressure. The evidence comes from the fact that the "turbulent" velocities inferred from CO linewidth scale in the same manner as the orbital velocity (a virial relation).

Physics

The physics of molecular clouds is poorly understood and much debated. Their internal motions are governed by turbulence in a cold, magnetized gas, for which the turbulent motions are highly supersonic but comparable to the speeds of magnetic disturbances. This state is thought to lose energy rapidly, requiring either an overall collapse or a steady reinjection of energy. At the same time, the clouds are known to be disrupted by some process—most likely the effects of massive stars—before a significant fraction of their mass has become stars.

Molecular clouds, and especially GMCs, are often the home of astronomical masers.

List of molecular cloud complexes

 Great Rift
 Serpens-Aquila Rift
 Rho Ophiuchi cloud complex
 Corona Australis molecular cloud
 Musca–Chamaeleonis molecular cloud
 Vela Molecular Ridge
 Orion molecular cloud complex
 Taurus molecular cloud
 Perseus molecular cloud

See also

References

External links

Nebulae
Cosmic dust
 
Concepts in astronomy